The 12th Pan American Games were held in Mar del Plata, Argentina from March 11 to March 26, 1995.

Medals

Silver

Men's Mountain Bike (MTB): Andres Brenes

Bronze

Men's – 58 kg: Pedro Carazo

See also
Costa Rica at the 1996 Summer Olympics

Nations at the 1995 Pan American Games
P
Costa Rica at the Pan American Games